Racing Club de Basse-Terre is a football club in Guadeloupe, based in Basse-Terre.

They play in Guadeloupe's second division, the Promotion d'Honneur Regionale.

Achievements
Guadeloupe Championnat National: 3
 1967–68, 1998–99, 2003–04

Coupe de Guadeloupe: 8
 1941–42, 1951, 1952, 1959, 1991, 2001, 2004, 2009

Coupe D.O.M.: 1
 2004

Ligue des Antilles: 1
 1979

External links
 Tour des clubs 2008-2009 - Gwadafoot 
 Club info - French Football Federation 	

Football clubs in Guadeloupe